Hymenocallis eucharidifolia is a rare plant in the plant in the Amaryllidaceae. It is native to rainforests in the Mexican states of Oaxaca and Guerrero.

Hymenocallis eucharidifolia was thought for over a century to be extinct in the wild until rediscovered a few years ago. The species is prized as an ornamental because of its showy white flowers.

References

eucharidifolia
Flora of Mexico
Plants described in 1884
Taxa named by John Gilbert Baker